is a former Japanese football player.

Playing career
Toba was born in Aichi Prefecture on July 16, 1975. After graduating from Juntendo University, he joined Japan Football League club Mito HollyHock in 1998. He played many matches as defender from first season and the club was promoted to J2 League from 2000. Although he played as regular player until 2002, his opportunity to play decreased in 2003 and he retired end of 2003 season.

Club statistics

References

External links

1975 births
Living people
Juntendo University alumni
Association football people from Aichi Prefecture
Japanese footballers
J2 League players
Japan Football League (1992–1998) players
Japan Football League players
Mito HollyHock players
Association football defenders